Vonoprazan, sold under the brand name Takecab among others, is a first-in-class potassium-competitive acid blocker medication. It was approved in the Japanese market in February 2015 and in Russia in April 2021.

Vonoprazan is used in form of the fumarate for the treatment of gastroduodenal ulcer (including some drug-induced peptic ulcers) and reflux esophagitis, and can be combined with antibiotics for the eradication of Helicobacter pylori.

Co-packaged combinations of vonoprazan with amoxicillin and vonoprazan with amoxicillin and clarithromycin were approved for medical use in the United States in May 2022.

Society and culture

Names 
Vonoprazan is the international nonproprietary name (INN).

References

External links 
 

Drugs acting on the gastrointestinal system and metabolism
Proton-pump inhibitors